Birrego is a rural locality in the central part of the Riverina near Boree Creek, New South Wales, Australia.  The countryside is flat and used predominantly for grain production.  It is situated by road, about 13 kilometres south of Sandigo and 31 kilometres south east of Morundah.

Birrego Post Office opened on 27 September 1921 and closed in 1959.

Notes and references

Towns in the Riverina
Towns in New South Wales